The 2022–23 FIS Alpine Ski Nor-Am Cup is the upcoming, fifty second consecutive Nor-Am Cup season, the second international level competition in alpine skiing.

Men

Calendar

Rankings

Overall

Downhill

Super-G

Giant slalom

Slalom

Women

Calendar

Rankings

Overall

Downhill

Super-G

Giant slalom

Slalom

References 

2022 in alpine skiing
2023 in alpine skiing